Ao Tegen (born 12 June 1975) is a Chinese judoka. He competed in the men's middleweight event at the 1996 Summer Olympics.

References

External links

1975 births
Living people
Chinese male judoka
Olympic judoka of China
Judoka at the 1996 Summer Olympics
Place of birth missing (living people)
Judoka at the 1998 Asian Games
Asian Games competitors for China
20th-century Chinese people